Mwambutsa IV Bangiricenge (6 May 1912 – 26 March 1977) was the penultimate king of Burundi (or mwami) who ruled between 1915 and 1966. He succeeded to the throne on the death of his father Mutaga IV Mbikije (reigned 1908–15). Born while Burundi was under German colonial rule, Mwambutsa's reign mostly coincided with Belgian colonial rule (1916–62). The Belgians retained the monarchs of both Rwanda and Burundi under the policy of indirect rule.

Early life and regency
He was one of two sons of Mwami (king) Mutaga IV and Ngenzahayo. Like other Burundian kings, he was an ethnic Ganwa. He became king, taking the regnal name Mwambutsa, on 16 December 1915 when he was still an infant following the death of his father in a family dispute. Because of his age, a regency was declared. Several family members, including Queen Mother Ririkumutima, served as regent. At the time of his coronation, Burundi was part of German East Africa but was captured by Belgium in 1916 during the East African campaign in World War I. In 1925, a full regency council was established with Belgian approval.

Mwambutsa underwent a traditional Burundian education until he was about the age of 13. In 1925 the Belgians opened a primary school in Muramvya so he could attend it. Two years later a Roman Catholic mission was established in Bukeye with the goal of further educating the prince and one day converting him to Catholicism. Mwambutsa's performance in school was undistinguished and he never converted.

Colonial reign 
Mwambutsa became a ruler in his own right on 28 August 1929, when the regency council declared he was of-age for the throne. On 24 December 1930 he married Thérèse Kanyonga, a Tutsi of the Abasine clan. He married her because she was Catholic.

Mwambutsa actively distanced himself from partisan politics, saying on 8 February 1960, "I do not belong to any political party...I do not authorize anyone and no party to claim exclusivity of my patronage or to discredit, in my name, any other party having as its goal the interest of the Barundi." In June 1962, shortly before Urundi's independence, he went on a tour of villages throughout the country to present a speech appealing to residents to commit to hard work and to respect law and order.

Post-independence rule and exile
Urundi became independent as the Kingdom of Burundi on 1 July 1962. Mwambutsa attended ceremonies in Bujumbura to mark the occasion, reviewing troops of the Burundian National Army. He delivered a speech in which he asked Burundians and foreign technicians to "work together in a common effort to make this Burundi a peaceful, hard-working, prosperous, and perfectly happy country."

On 15 December Mwambutsa was made a member of the Order of Pope Pius IX. He met with Pope John XXIII at Vatican City the following day.

On the independence of Burundi, Mwambutsa IV became the head of state of Burundi with far reaching political power. In Rwanda, the monarchy had been overthrown between 1959–62. He attempted to balance ethnic tensions between ethnic Hutu and Tutsi subjects by choosing his Prime Ministers from each ethnic group alternately. In October 1965, Hutu officers attempted a coup d'état against the monarchy. Despite their failure to take power, Mwambutsa fled into exile in the Republic of the Congo, eventually moving to Switzerland. In March 1966 he designated his only surviving son to exercise his powers in the country. Still in exile, Mwambutsa was officially deposed in a second coup d'état and brought his son to power as Ntare V on 8 July 1966. The monarchy was finally abolished altogether in a third coup in November 1966 and its leader, Michel Micombero, came to power as president and dictator. Mwambutsa spent the rest of his life in Switzerland where he died in 1977.

Exhumation
Mwambutsa's remains were exhumed from their burial site in Switzerland in 2012 with a view to repatriating them to Burundi for a state funeral. After a legal battle, however, the remains were re-interred in Switzerland in 2016 in accordance with his family's wishes.

References

Bibliography

External link

1912 births
1977 deaths
Burundian kings
Recipients of the Grand Cross of the Order of Leopold II
Leaders ousted by a coup
Burundian expatriates in Switzerland
People from Muramvya Province